Bandikui Junction railway station is a major railway station in Dausa district, Rajasthan. Its code is BKI. It serves Bandikui city. The station consists of six platforms. The platforms are well sheltered. It has many facilities including water and sanitation.

Station is a major railway station at the junction of Agra–Jaipur and Delhi–Jaipur railway lines in Dausa district of Rajasthan. It is one of the earliest railway stations in northern India and also was the destination of steam locomotives. The first train in Rajasthan ran from Bandikui Junction to Agra Fort, started in April 1874 by the colonial government in India.

References

Railway stations in Dausa district
Jaipur railway division